O scrisoare pierdută (Romanian for "A Lost Letter") is a play by Ion Luca Caragiale. It premiered in 1884, and arguably represents the high point of his career.

It was adapted into a 1953 film A Lost Letter.

Characters
 Nae Cațavencu: lawyer, manager and owner of the „Răcnetul Carpaților” (The Roar of the Carpathians) newspaper, president and founder of the Enciclopedic- Cooperative Society „Aurora Economică Română” (the Romanian Economical Aurora) 
 Zaharia Trahanache: President of the Permanent Committee, of the Electoral Committee, of the School Committee, of the Agricultural Committee and of other Committees. 
 Zoe Trahanache: the wife of the above mentioned
 Ghiță Pristanda: the town's policeman
 Cetățeanul turmentat (the drunk citizen)
 Agamemnon (Agamiță) Dandanache: an old warrior from the 1848 Revolution
 Tache Farfuridi: lawyer, member of the committees above mentioned
 Iordache Brânzovenescu: same
 Ștefan Tipătescu: the prefect of the county.
 Ionescu: elementary school teacher, collaborator of the above mentioned newspaper and member of the Society
 Popescu: same
 Voters, Citizen and Public

See also
List of Romanian plays

Notes

References
Tudor Vianu, Scriitori români, Vol. I-III, Editura Minerva, Bucharest, 1970-1971. 

1884 plays
Romanian plays adapted into films
Romanian plays
Works by Ion Luca Caragiale